The Chevrolet Silverado is a range of trucks manufactured by General Motors under the Chevrolet brand.  Introduced for the 1999 model year, the Silverado is the successor to the long running Chevrolet C/K model line.  Taking its name from the top trim level from the Chevrolet C/K series, the Silverado is offered as a series of full-size pickup trucks, chassis cab trucks, and medium-duty trucks.  The fourth generation of the model line was introduced for the 2019 model year.

The Chevrolet Silverado shares mechanical commonality with the GMC Sierra; GMC ended the use of the C/K nomenclature a model generation prior to Chevrolet.  In Mexico, high trim level versions of the Silverado use the Chevrolet Cheyenne name.  Competing against the Ford F-Series, Ram Pickup, Nissan Titan, and Toyota Tundra, the Silverado is among the best-selling vehicles in the United States, having sold over 12 million examples since its introduction in 1999.

History
The Silverado nameplate made its debut for the 1975 model year, becoming the top trim level on all Chevrolet C/K trucks, slotted above Custom Deluxe, Scottsdale, and Cheyenne.  At the same time, GMC C/K trucks used variations of the Sierra name (Sierra, Sierra Classic, Sierra Grande, and High Sierra).  Today, Chevrolet still uses the CK and the CC in their current model codes to denote a 2-wheel rear drive (CC), or a four-wheel drive (CK).

For the 1988 GMT400 model architecture, Chevrolet retained the C/K model nomenclature, with GMC branding its full-size line as Sierras.  While sharing chassis and bodies, the model chronology of the Silverado and Sierra are different, with five generations of the Sierra and four of the Silverado.

In 2018, at the NTEA Work Truck Show in Indianapolis, IN, Chevrolet unveiled the first medium-duty Silverado, expanding the model line to a 4500, 5500, and 6500 chassis cab.  Largely the successor to the 2003-2010 GMT560 chassis, the medium-duty truck is exclusive to Chevrolet, with no plans for an equivalent GMC version. Instead, International would sell the Silverado Medium Duty as a rebadged counterpart, called the "CV".

First-generation Silverado / second-generation Sierra (GMT800; 1999)

The GMT800 Silverado/Sierra 1500 and 2500 pickup trucks were released in August 1998 as 1999 models. The "classic" light-duty GMT400 C/K trucks were continued in production for that first year alongside the new models, and the Heavy-Duty GMT400 pickups (alongside the GMT400 SUVs) were continued until 2000, with the new GMT800 Silverado/Sierra HD (Heavy Duty) released a year later. A small refresh for 2003 models was introduced in 2002, bringing slight design changes and an upgrade to the audio and HVAC controls. The 2007.5 GMT800 trucks, built after the GMT900 had gone on sale, used the name Classic to denote the difference between the two generations.

Second-generation Silverado / third-generation Sierra (GMT900; 2007) 

The all-new GMT900 generation of the Silverado/Sierra arrived in the last quarter of 2006 as a 2007 model. It features a redesigned exterior, interior, frame, and suspension as well as power increases on certain engines. Like the previous generation GMT800's and earlier C/K lines, it takes styling cues from the GMT900 SUVs of the same year, and also even from the 2004 Chevrolet Colorado/GMC Canyon. Like the GMT900 SUVs, these pickups also have greatly improved aerodynamics over their predecessors thanks to steeply raked windshields and tighter panel gaps which help improve fuel economy. The previous GMT800 models were continued through 2007 badged as "Classic", just as the GMT400 models continued for two years after the GMT800's introduction.

The new Silverado earned the North American Truck of the Year award for 2007 and was Motor Trend magazine's Truck of the Year for 2007. Like its predecessors, the new Silverado offers buyers a choice of two-door regular cabs, four-door extended cabs (with front-opening rear doors that now open 170 degrees similar to the Nissan Titan) and four-door crew cabs. GM also offers the trucks in the traditional two- and four-wheel-drive configurations.

For the 2007 model year, the Sierra Denali shares the same billet grille from the other Denali models, and also has the same dash as the 2007 SUV's. This truck is also an optional all-wheel-drive vehicle and goes  in 6.3 seconds.

The Generation III small block V8 engines offered in the GMT800 trucks were replaced in the GMT900 series by the Generation IV small block V8 engine family, featuring upgrades such as increased power and Active Fuel Management on the 5.3 L and 6.0 L V8s.

After skipping the 2008 model year, with 2007 being the last for the GMT800 hybrid line, a two-mode hybrid model was introduced in late 2008 as a 2009 model. General Motors discontinued the Silverado Hybrid due to poor sales along with the GMC Sierra Hybrid, Chevy Avalanche, Chevy Tahoe Hybrid, GMC Yukon Hybrid, Cadillac Escalade Hybrid, and Cadillac Escalade EXT after the 2013 model year although it was the one of the first two hybrid pickup trucks ever manufactured. Available in either two- or four-wheel-drive, the Sierra 1500 Hybrid is powered by a 6.0-liter V8. It's joined by two 60-kilowatt electric motors supplied by a nickel–metal hydride battery pack under the rear seat. On its own, the V8 is rated at 332 horsepower and 367 pound-feet of torque. GM engineers say that combined output with the electric motors is 379 hp. The unique transmission houses the electric motors along with three different planetary gear sets and four traditional clutches.

There were two dash options offered in this model Silverado and Sierra: a luxury-inspired dash that closely mimics the dash in their GMT900 SUVs, and a more traditional upright dash to make room for a passenger seat in place of a center console.

As of 2008, GM full-size trucks were no longer sold in United States and Canada with manual transmissions; they were only offered in Mexico in the Silverado 1500 V6 engine and Silverado 3500.

All Silverado and Sierra 1/2-ton models received a revised bumper and shortened front fascia for the 2009 model year, and extended and crew cab models equipped with the Vortec 5300 V8 received a new six-speed 6L80 automatic transmission. The Vortec 6200 V8 was made available for LTZ and SLT models. Bluetooth was added to the equipment list, becoming standard on Denali, SLT, and LTZ - and optional on SLE and LT, as was an optional rear vision camera. An integrated trailer brake controller, first available on the Silverado and Sierra HD for 2007, is now an option on 1500 series trucks. The XFE package was new for 2009, available only on Silverado 1500 Crew Cab LT 2-wheel-drive models, it included the 5.3L Vortec V8, soft tonneau cover, XFE badging, aluminum wheels, and low rolling resistance tires.

A refresh followed with all 2010 models, including new interior door panels (which moved the handle forward and added an additional cup holder), and a six-speed automatic transmission on Regular Cab models with the 5.3L V8 was also made standard. The Vortec 6200 V8 was given wider availability, now being optional on LT and SLE Extended and Crew Cabs, completely supplanting the light-duty Vortec 6000 V8 in the process. The new Z71 Appearance Package was optional on LT and LTZ, it included: body-color grille and front fascia, body-color door handles and mirror caps, unique Z71 box side decals, chrome sill plates, and a unique Z71 gauge cluster.  Two new exterior colors were added: Taupe Gray Metallic and Sheer Silver Metallic.

For 2012, the Sierra and Silverado 1500 received another refresh. This time the Silverado was given new grille and front fascia treatments for both LT and LTZ models. A newly redesigned touch-screen navigation radio was optional on LTZ, SLT, and Denali. Trailer sway control and hill start assist are now standard on all models. Cooled seats were made optional on LTZ and SLT and the woodgrain trim was replaced with brushed aluminum.

Heavy-Duty 

For the first time, the 8.1 L big block V8 is no longer offered on the Heavy-Duty models, and no replacement has been announced. The 6L90 6-speed automatic transmission is standard in all Heavy-Duty models. The Allison 1000 transmission is paired with the optional Duramax V8 diesel.

As of 2011, the GMC and Chevrolet Heavy Duty models have been upgraded with a new fully boxed high strength steel frame from front to rear improving stiffness by 92% with bigger rear springs, larger engine and transmission mounts and new hydraulic body mounts to improve the ride. The front suspension incorporates new upper and lower control arms and new torsion bars tailored to one of five different gross axle weight ratings. Upper control arms are constructed from forged steel that is both stronger and lighter than the previous arms, while the new lower arms are cast iron to maximize load capacity. Using a unique torsion bar for each gross weight rating allows for better control over vehicle height, resulting in improved handling and better alignment for reduced tire wear. These improvements allow for up to a 6,000-pound front axle weight rating, allowing all 4wd trucks to accommodate a snowplow.

Additional front suspension enhancements come from new urethane bump stops, two per side. The upper shock mount has been changed from a single stem mount to a two-bolt design to eliminate the possibility of squeaks and thumps.

The rear suspension design uses asymmetrical leaf springs that are wider and capable of greater load handling. The design features 3-inch-wide leaves, with front and rear spring sections of different lengths to reduce the twisting that can result in axle hop and loss of traction.

Engines

Production location switch
For the 2011 model year of the Silverado/Sierra, the production of 1500 crew cab models partially moved from Silao, Mexico to Flint, Michigan.

Safety
The Silverado comes standard with four-wheel ABS. StabiliTrak and side curtain airbags are optional on certain trim levels.

2007 NHTSA crash test:

Frontal Driver: 
Frontal Passenger: 
Side Driver: 
Side Rear Passenger: 
Rollover: 

The IIHS gave the Silverado a "Good" score in their frontal crash test. The 2007-09 models equipped with or without optional side curtain airbags received a "Poor" rating in the side impact test.  For 2010, the side structure was strengthened, side torso air bags were added, and side airbags became standard leading to the IIHS side impact overall rating improving to "Acceptable" and the overall side structure rating improved from "Poor" to "Acceptable".  The crew cab variant of the 2011-13 Silverado is also rated "Marginal" in the IIHS roof strength test.

Electric version
In 2011 developer of the Chevrolet Volt and former vice chairman Bob Lutz joined VIA Motors in developing electric versions of the Chevrolet Silverado/GMC Sierra called VIA VTrux.

Third-generation Silverado / fourth-generation Sierra (K2XX; 2014) 

On December 13, 2012, the redesigned 2014 Chevrolet Silverado and GMC Sierra were both introduced in Detroit, Michigan, later making their public debut at the North American International Auto Show. GM dropped the 900 platform and changed to K2XX. The third generation Silverado 1500 has three gas engine options; a 4.3 L EcoTec3 V6, a 5.3 L EcoTec3 V8, and a 6.2 L EcoTec3 V8. Chevrolet's MyLink touch-screen multimedia interface system became available on most models. It included A2DP stereo streaming technologies, Bluetooth hands-free telephone, USB hookups, and an input for an Apple iPod or iPhone. When connected via the USB port, an iPhone 4/4S, iPhone 5/iPhone 5S, iPhone 6, or iPhone 6 Plus is able to stream music from Pandora Radio. A Bose premium audio system, as well as a Bose surround sound audio system is available on most models. OnStar became standard on all models.

Underneath, the Silverado rides on a fully boxed high-strength steel frame with hydroforming technology; truck cab's frame is built with high strength steel as well. The third generation Silverado uses aluminum on the hood, for the engine block and for the control arms in order to save mass. The truck's bed is made of roll-formed steel instead of stamped steel used by other manufacturers in order to save weight and gain strength. The third generation Silverado introduced the all-new upmarket top-of-the-line "High Country" trim level which includes saddle brown leather interior, which is Chevrolet's first entry into the luxury truck market. A fully-squared front end takes styling cues from the 1994–1998 C/K trucks, and, on Z71 models, a Z71 badge was added to the front grille. The first production Silverado completed assembly on April 29, 2013. The Silverado 1500 went on sale in May 2013 as a 2014 model, with the Silverado HD being available in early 2014 for the 2015 model year. On January 10, 2014, a recall was issued for 370,000 Silverado and Sierra pickups due to a fire risk.

The American model version of the 2014 Chevrolet Silverado 1500/2500HD/3500HD and the 2015 Chevrolet Silverado High Country was introduced to the Philippines market by Chevrolet Motorama Show late November 2014 as a MY2015, along with the MY2015 Chevrolet Suburban, 2015 Chevrolet Tahoe, 2015 Chevrolet Impala, 2015 Chevrolet Express Van, 2015 Chevrolet Trax and 2015 Chevrolet Colorado.

On January 14, 2014, The Silverado, along with the Chevrolet Corvette Stingray, received the 2014 North American International Auto Show's Car and Truck of the Year awards.

For 2018, this generation of Silverado was officially exported to Australia and converted to the right-hand-drive and Australian Design Rules (ADR) by General Motors Australian subsidiary, Holden Special Vehicles (HSV). In the past, several independent specialists imported and converted Silverado and GMC Sierra for Australian and right-hand-drive markets. The 2500HD and 3500HD were fitted with 6.6-liter/litre Duramax diesel V8, the sole engine choice for Australia. No 1500 version was offered.

2015

For the 2015 model year, the 6.2L EcoTec3 was paired with the new 8-speed 8L90 transmission, offering a wider ratio spread with more closely spaced gears, quicker shifts, improved acceleration, and fuel economy. The Silverado 2500HD/3500HD models continue to use the 6.0-liter L96 flex fuel capable Vortec engine combined with the 6L90E transmission, installed with engine oil and transmission fluid coolers for hauling/towing applications. The 6.6-liter Duramax also continued to be backed by the 6-speed Allison 1000 automatic.

The GMC Sierra 2500HD/3500HD were the first "heavy-duty" trucks to offer an Adaptive Cruise Control (ACC), a Forward Collision Warning System (FCWS), and a Lane Departure Warning System (LDWS) available together as part of the available Driver Assist Package. The Driver Assist Package was standard equipment on the GMC Sierra 2500HD/3500HD Denali, and optional on most other Chevrolet Silverado 2500HD/3500HD and GMC Sierra 2500HD/3500HD models. Other new options for the Silverado and Sierra 2500HD/3500HD models included an eight-inch, full-color, reconfigurable LCD Driver Information Center (DIC) screen (for Sierra 2500HD/3500HD Denali models only), a 110-Volt AC household-style power outlet, up to six available USB ports, an available eight-inch touchscreen infotainment system, and a power-sliding rear window with integrated defroster.

In mid-year 2015, Chevrolet and GMC made enhancements to the all-new Silverado 2500HD/3500HD and Sierra 2500HD/3500HD. Some of these enhancements included a new OnStar telematics system with 4G LTE Wi-Fi capabilities, new wheel designs, new exterior paint color options, new exterior tow mirror designs, a USB port added the glove compartment of trucks equipped with a front bench seat, DURALIFE brake rotors, the availability of dual 150 and 220 amp alternators for models equipped with the 6.6-liter Duramax Turbodiesel V8 engine, an off-road information screen added to the instrument cluster of 4X4 models equipped with the Z71 or All-Terrain Packages (the latter is a GMC-only option), a Bi-Fi Compressed Natural Gas (CNG) option for models equipped with the 6.0L Vortec gasoline V8 engine, a new All-Terrain Package available on SLE and SLT Double Cab and Crew Cab models (for GMC models only), a standard heavy-duty locking rear axle for all models, and the removal of HD Radio from the "up-level" IO5 and IO6 infotainment systems. A Regular Production Option (RPO) Code of "AVF" in the upper glove compartment distinguishes early-build 2015 models from their 2015.5 successors.

Special Editions
For 2015, Chevrolet introduced Special Edition for the Silverado truck series.  They are in the following series of Rally Edition 1 and 2, Midnight Edition, Custom Sport Edition, Custom Sport Plus Edition, Black Out Edition, and Texas Edition.

2016 facelift

For 2016, the Chevrolet Silverado 1500 and GMC Sierra 1500 received its first mid-cycle refresh, similar to 2003 first generation models. The refreshed Silverado and Sierra received a new grille, new headlights and new front fascia, with design influences from the 2015 Chevrolet Colorado, as well as all-new LED taillights on the 2016 Silverado LTZ and High Country, 2016 GMC Sierra SLT and Denali trim levels while the 2016 Chevy Silverado LT trim levels and below still have the pre-facelifted incandescent taillights along with the 2016 GMC Sierra SLE trim levels and below. Silverado 1500 LTZ and High Country, as well as Sierra 1500 SLT and Denali models equipped with LED headlights, can be optioned with the Intellibeam high beam assist system. On October 1, 2015, HD Radio was added to the Silverado, Sierra, and their HD level models. The Silverado/Silverado HD adds HD Radio to their 8-inch MyLink system as a standard on the LT and LTZ trims, while the Sierra/Sierra HD includes the feature in its IntelliLink system as a standard on all its trims. 2016 Silverado and Sierra models optioned with the 8-inch touch screen feature Apple CarPlay and Android Auto capability. Trucks ordered with bucket seats and center console now feature a wireless charging pad on the console lid. New color options for the Silverado include Iridescent Pearl Tricoat (1500 only), Autumn Bronze Metallic, Siren Red Tintcoat and Red Hot, while the Sierra's new colors include White Frost Tricoat (also 1500 only), Mahogany Metallic, Crimson Red Tintcoat and Cardinal Red.

Chevrolet Special Edition 
For that year, Chevrolet has added and dropped some of the Special Editions for the Silverado truck series.  They are in the following series of Rally Edition 1 and 2, Midnight HD Edition, Midnight Edition, Custom Sport HD Edition, Realtree Edition, Custom Sport HD Edition, and Special Ops Edition.

2017
For the 2017 model year, Silverado and Sierra HD models equipped with the 6.6-liter Duramax Turbodiesel V8 (L5P) received a new front hood with air intake vents. Gasoline-powered models now have a capless fuel fill. Sierra HD now features standard HID headlamps on all trim levels. New colors include Graphite Metallic and Pepperdust Metallic (Chevrolet) or Dark Slate Metallic and Pepperdust Metallic (GMC). Jet Black/Medium Ash Gray interior trim is added for Silverado High Country. Low-Speed Mitigation Braking is added to the Driver Alert Package for both Silverado and Sierra.

All Silverado and Sierra models receive slight changes to their MyLink (Chevrolet) and IntelliLink (GMC) infotainment systems. The interior backlighting on GMC Sierras changes from red to blue. 2017 Silverado and Sierra Double and Crew Cabs also get a few new safety features, including GM's Rear Seat Reminder, and Teen Driver Mode.

eAssist Mild Hybrid
Starting in 2016, GM offered an eAssist mild hybrid version of the 5.3-liter V8 engine in the Silverado LT and Sierra SLT, but only in the state of California. The engine came with an 8-speed automatic transmission and has the same horsepower and torque as the regular 5.3 V8.  For 2017, it was also available in Hawaii, Oregon, Texas, and Washington.  For 2018, it became available nationwide and was also offered in the Silverado LTZ.

Silverado SSV
In late 2014, Chevrolet released the 2015 Silverado SSV (Special Service Vehicle) to complement its lineup of law enforcement vehicles. The SSV Silverado is available in 1500 Crew Cab form with either the short (5.5') or standard (6.5') cargo box. The 5.3-liter EcoTec3 V8 is the only engine option, and the truck is based on WT trim. It features beefier brake rotors, upgraded oil coolers, high output alternator, auxiliary battery and an upfitter friendly interior.

Special editions

GMC
On the exterior, the Sierra All Terrain X features black 18-inch rims fitted with larger 265/65R18SL Goodyear Wrangler Duratrac MT tires, black bed-mounted sport bar, LED off-road lights, and blacked-out accents.

After introducing the Sierra 1500 All Terrain X full-size pickup and the Canyon All Terrain X small pickup, in 2017 GMC extended the same formula to its heavy-duty pickup family with the Sierra HD All Terrain X.

Available on four-wheel drive Sierra 2500 HD crew cab models come in either Black Onyx or Summit White exterior colors.

All Terrain X models have a body-color grille surround and a grille insert that's unique to All Terrain. Body color door handles, front and rear bumpers, and bodyside moldings, and black accents, including belt moldings, front bumper skid plate, and B-pillar accents, give it a monochromatic appearance.

Sierra HD All Terrain X models also include eighteen-inch black-painted aluminum wheels – fitted with LT275/65R18 Goodyear Duratrac MT-rated tires – along with four-inch black sport side steps, black heated and power-folding trailering mirrors with integrated turn signals and LED guidance lamps, a spray-on bedliner, and a black bed-mounted sport bar, which is designed to support available GMC Accessories LED off-road driving lamps.

Inside, the 2017 Sierra 2500 HD All Terrain X has GMC IntelliLink with an 8-inch-diagonal color touchscreen, Teen Driver, remote-locking tailgate, remote starting system, Rear Vision Camera, adjustable pedals, leather-trimmed seats, heated front seats and wireless mobile device charging.

A 6.0-liter gasoline engine is standard, but the 6.6-liter Duramax Diesel turbo-diesel V-8 is also available.

The Sierra HD All Terrain X also includes the Z71 off-road suspension package, which adds front underbody and transfer case skid plates, twin-tube Rancho shocks, hill descent control, and off-road information graphics in the Driver Information Center. An Eaton automatically locking rear differential (4.10:1) is also standard equipment.

2017

Special Edition

Chevrolet
There were several additions to this year's Special Editions for the Silverado series shown in boldface.  They are the following series of Midnight, Midnight HD, Rally 1, Rally 2, High Desert, Custom Sport HD, Realtree, Special Ops, Alaskan (Available on HD series only), Redline and Black Out.  The remaining Special Edition listed in the 2017 Chevrolet Silverado brochure were All Star Edition and Texas Edition.

New for 2017 was the High Desert option package. This package brought a new innovative lockable storage system into the bed of the Silverado 1500 Crew Cab model. The system includes a three-piece hard tonneau cover, dual lockable storage bins on each side of the truck bed, and a removable bed divider to keep items separate and from moving around the truck bed while the vehicle is in motion. Avalanche-like plastic fairings were also added to the rear of the cab. The High Desert package was available on both two-wheel-drive and four-wheel-drive LT, LTZ, and High Country trim levels. It was not available on LTZ models with the Z71 off-road package. LT models with the High Desert package receive the same LED taillamps as the LTZ, and High Country trims. Magnetic Ride Control is optional on High Country High Desert.

2018

Special Edition
To commemorate the 100th anniversary of Chevy Trucks, GM introduced special edition models of the Chevrolet Silverado and the smaller Chevrolet Colorado.

Chevrolet
Chevrolet introduced the Centennial Edition Chevrolet Silverado for 2018. Only available in a Crew Cab Short Box LTZ Z71 configuration, the Centennial Edition added Centennial Blue Metallic paint, 22-inch painted-aluminum wheels with chrome inserts and special 100-years Chevrolet Bowtie emblems.  In addition to the Centennial Edition, the remaining Silverado Special Editions were virtually unchanged from the last year model.

2019 Silverado LD
Chevrolet continued production of the third-generation Silverado 1500 for 2019, which was sold alongside the all-new, fourth-generation 2019 Chevrolet Silverado 1500. Renamed the Chevrolet Silverado LD ("LD" for Light Duty), production of the previous-generation truck moved from Fort Wayne, Indiana to Oshawa Car Assembly, Ontario, Canada. Only available in a Double Cab/Standard Box configuration, the Silverado LD ended production in December 2019.

The first-generation Chevrolet Silverado 1500 was sold alongside the second-generation Chevrolet Silverado 1500 for the 2007 model year as the Chevrolet Silverado 1500 Classic, and 2500 and 3500 versions of the truck were also sold alongside their successors, the Chevrolet Silverado 2500 and 3500. GMC also offered versions of their Sierra trucks as the Sierra Classic for 2007 as well, and did the same for 2019, offering the predecessor generation model as the 2019 GMC Sierra 1500 Limited.

Engines

Fourth-generation Silverado / fifth-generation Sierra (T1XX; 2019) 

On December 16, 2017, Chevrolet unveiled the all-new, fourth-generation 2019 Silverado 1500 at its Chevy Truck Centennial Celebration Weekend at Texas Motor Speedway in Fort Worth, Texas. The reveal of the all-new Silverado was not expected until early 2018. For its debut, the Silverado 1500 was airlifted via helicopter onto a stage, where it was introduced to a crowd of Chevrolet truck owners and enthusiasts, as well as to the automotive press. Chevrolet NASCAR driver Dale Earnhardt Jr. also spoke at the event. In addition to the reveal of the 2019 Silverado 1500, multiple Chevrolet trucks of different generations were on display as well.

The model shown at the reveal was the 2019 Chevrolet Silverado 1500 LT Trail Boss, which is a factory-modified version of the Silverado 1500 LT Z71. Distinguishing features of the Trail Boss from other Silverado 1500 trim levels are its gloss black front fascia, black rear step bumper, black Chevrolet "bow-tie" emblems on the front grille and rear tailgate, gloss black-finished aluminum-alloy wheels, large off-road tires, altered suspension, "Trail Boss" decals on the sides of the pickup box, front bumper-mounted center fog lamps, "Z71" emblems on each front fender, and red-painted front tow hooks.

The formal unveiling of the Silverado 1500 took place at the 2018 North American International Auto Show in Detroit, Michigan on January 13, 2018, exactly 100 years after Chevrolet delivered its first trucks to customers on January 13, 1918. The model was unveiled as a Silverado LT Trail Boss 4X4 model.

Sales to customers began in August 2018 as an early 2019 model year vehicle with a base price of $32,200 MSRP.

The Silverado 1500 features a more sculpted exterior design, with front headlamps that integrate into the front grille, which also incorporate LED Daytime Running Accent Lamps (DRL's).

Silverado 1500 has been launched in Australia for the first time for 2020 model year. Holden Special Vehicles (to be renamed as General Motors Specialty Vehicles for 2021) has started the conversion to right-hand-drive and Australian Design Rules. The 6.2L V8 engine is the sole engine choice at the launch.

Trims
The Silverado 1500 will be available in eight distinct trim levels: WT, Custom, Custom Trail Boss, LT, RST, LT Trail Boss, LTZ, and High Country.

All trim levels include a next-generation touchscreen infotainment system with Apple CarPlay and Android Auto, Bluetooth for hands-free calling and wireless audio streaming via A2DP, power windows and door locks (on Double and Crew Cab models), air conditioning, and a rearview backup camera system. Additional features available on select trim levels include GPS navigation, SiriusXM Satellite Radio and Travel Link, OnStar with 4G LTE in-vehicle Wi-Fi, a Bose premium audio system with seven speakers, keyless access and push-button start, a remote starter system, heated and ventilated luxury leather-trimmed seating surfaces, a heated leather-wrapped steering wheel, driver-assist technologies, a multi-angle camera system, and heated rear seats.

Special Editions
For 2020, the Rally and Midnight Special Editions return after being absent for the 2019 model year. Rally Edition is available on Silverado Custom and RST trims. The package features black Rally Stripes on the hood and tailgate, black CHEVROLET tailgate lettering, and black assist steps. The Midnight Edition features Bucket Seats with Console, special headlamp bezels, black dual exhaust tips, and black assist steps. The Midnight Edition is only available on the LT Trail Boss trim level.

In January 2020, Chevrolet and Realtree announced the 2021 Silverado 1500 Realtree Edition. This is the second-time Chevrolet and Realtree have teamed up to produce a special edition Silverado truck, having done so for 2016. The 2021 model is based on a Silverado 1500 Crew Cab Custom Trail Boss, adding 20-inch black wheels and Realtree camouflage graphics inside and out.

Engines

The all-new 2019 Chevrolet Silverado and GMC Sierra 1500 offers a choice of six different engine options, dependent upon trim level. Standard on mid-level trims is an all-new, 2.7-liter turbocharged inline-four gasoline engine that is the smallest engine available on a half-ton pickup, and features cylinder deactivation for improved fuel economy. The availability of either AFM or DFM is dependent on trim level, with WT and Custom trucks available with AFM, and LT and above trucks standard with DFM. An all-new,  3.0-liter turbocharged Duramax I6 engine became available for the 2020 model year. Availability of this engine had been delayed due to EPA certification. All engines are paired to either a 6-speed, 8-speed, or 10-speed automatic transmission, with a choice of either two-wheel-drive or four-wheel-drive (4X4 is standard equipment on Silverado 1500 Custom Trail Boss and LT Trail Boss trims, and optional on all other Silverado 1500 and Sierra 1500 models). For 2020, availability of both the 6.2-liter EcoTec3 V8 gasoline engine and the 10-speed automatic transmission will expand to most Silverado 1500 and Sierra 1500 trim levels.

According to EPA ratings, rear drive 2019 Silverado models with the 2.7-liter turbo-four engine can achieve / city/highway.

Infotainment system
Standard features include a next generation infotainment system with Apple CarPlay and Android Auto. The Waze mobile app can now be compatible in its infotainment system through the use of CarPlay.

A seven-inch infotainment system is standard on Chevrolet Silverado 1500 W/T, Custom, and Custom Trail Boss models, as well as the GMC Sierra 1500 Base (Sierra) model, while an eight-inch infotainment system is standard on the Silverado 1500 LT, LT Trail Boss, RST, LTZ, and High Country models, as well as the Sierra 1500 SLE, SLT, AT4, and Denali. SiriusXM Satellite Radio, OnStar with 4G LTE Wi-Fi, a seven-speaker Bose premium audio system, HD Radio, GPS navigation, SiriusXM Travel Link, and a multi-angle camera system are all available depending upon the trim level selected. For 2020, Silverado and Sierra models add SiriusXM 360L compatibility.

Payload and towing

Trailering features equipped for the 2019 model includes an industry's first VIN-specific trailering and payload label and an in-vehicle towing app on its GM infotainment system.

Safety
Advanced, active safety features included in the 2019 Chevrolet Silverado are:
 Lane Change Alert with Side Blind Zone Alert
 Front and Rear Park Assist
 Lane Keep Assist
 Low-Speed Forward Automatic Braking
 IntelliBeam headlamps, high-beam assist
 Front Pedestrian Braking
 Surround Vision 360-degree Camera System

Variants

Chevrolet Silverado HD

Chevrolet released three all-new 2020 Silverado models, including the Silverado 2500 HD and 3500 HD, in 2019. Chevrolet debuted the truck at GM's Flint, Michigan plant on February 5, 2019. The trucks had made their arrival at the dealerships in the late summer of 2019.

Payload and towing

GMC Sierra
The fifth-generation GMC Sierra was unveiled in Detroit on March 1, 2018. The Sierra 1500 differentiates itself from its Chevrolet Silverado 1500 counterpart by offering unique features, such as a two-piece tailgate, a pickup bed constructed from carbon fiber, a  multi-color head-up display, a rear-view mirror backup camera system, and a luxury Denali trim level. The Sierra 1500 also features its own distinct exterior styling, though interior styling is similar to that of the Chevrolet Silverado 1500.

There are six functions of GMC Sierra's Multi-Pro Tailgate including a primary tailgate load stop for large items. Its inner tailgate can be a load stopper, a full-width step, and a work area by dropping down the load stop or provide easy access to the bed just by folding down the inner tailgate.

Powertrains include improved versions of the current 5.3-liter and 6.2-liter EcoTec3 V8 gasoline engines, as well as the same 3.0-liter Duramax turbocharged diesel I6 engine that is also available in the 2019 Chevrolet Silverado 1500. An all-new, ten-speed automatic transmission comes as standard equipment on gasoline-powered Sierra 1500 models. Availability of the previous 4.3-liter EcoTec3 V6 gasoline engine was not announced at launch.

All trim levels include a next-generation touchscreen infotainment system with Apple CarPlay and Android Auto, Bluetooth for hands-free calling and wireless audio streaming via A2DP, power windows and door locks (on Double and Crew Cab models), air conditioning, and a rear-view backup camera system. Additional features available on select trim levels include GPS navigation, SiriusXM Satellite Radio and Travel Link, OnStar with 4G LTE in-vehicle Wi-Fi, a Bose premium audio system with seven speakers, keyless access and push-button start, a remote starter system, heated and ventilated luxury leather-trimmed seating surfaces, a heated leather-wrapped steering wheel, driver-assist technologies, a multi-angle camera system, and heated rear seats.

The 2019 GMC Sierra went on sale in September 2018 as an early 2019 model year vehicle at GMC dealerships nationwide.

Regular Cab
Initially unavailable at launch, the all-new 2019 Chevrolet Silverado 1500 and GMC Sierra 1500 regular cab configuration went on sale in early 2019. Only available with an  pickup box, with a choice of two-wheel-drive or four-wheel-drive and the 4.3-liter EcoTec3 V6 or 5.3-liter V8 gasoline engines, the regular cab is exclusively available in W/T trim (1WT) for Silverado 1500, or Sierra (1SA) trim for Sierra 1500. The regular cab option is unavailable in other trim levels in the United States and Canada, as these trucks will appeal mainly towards fleet and commercial buyers. Regular cab models with a  bed and in higher trim levels are produced but are only available for sale in Mexico and the Middle East.  Starting in 2022, regular cab models with a  bed were made available in the United States and Canada, albeit only in W/T trim.

Standard features include a black front grille, black front and rear bumpers, 17" steel wheels, manual windows and door locks, manual black side mirrors, a seven-inch touchscreen infotainment system with rearview backup camera and Apple CarPlay and Android Auto smartphone integration, vinyl seating surfaces, a split front bench seat, vinyl flooring, and air conditioning. Options include the Chrome Appearance Group (17" aluminum-alloy wheels and chrome front and rear bumpers), OnStar 4G LTE in-vehicle Wi-Fi capabilities, cloth seating surfaces, carpeted flooring with floor mats, and the Power Equipment Group (power windows and door locks, keyless entry, power black side mirrors, and cruise control).

2020 changes
The 2020 Silverado sees deletion of the Oakwood Metallic exterior paint color. Major additions are new vertical trailering mirrors, which include power adjustability, as well as power-folding and power-extension capabilities. Adaptive Cruise control is optional on the LTZ and High Country trim levels, and SiriusXM 360L capability is available on LT and higher trims. Silverado 1500s lose the keyless access buttons on the rear doors.

The Sierra sees a new Carbon Black Metallic paint color in addition to the above-mentioned Silverado updates.

2020 is the final model year for Double Cab 1500 models in LTZ, SLT, and AT4 trims.

2021 changes
For 2021, the Silverado and Sierra pickups saw relatively few changes. Most notably, the Silverado 1500 offers the newly named Multi-Flex six-position tailgate, which is borrowed from the GMC Sierra, and the introduction of wireless CarPlay and Android Auto projection capability. The 2.7-liter 4-cylinder and 3.0-liter Duramax diesel-equipped Silverado and Sierra models see increased tow capacity ratings and new towing technology, including a jack-knife alert and trailer length indicator. Several colors were changed on the Silverado; Havana Brown Metallic and Cajun Red Tintcoat are replaced by Oxford Brown Metallic and Cherry Red Tintcoat, respectively, and Mosaic Black Metallic is a new addition. 2021 Sierra models received color changes as well; Deep Mahogany Metallic, Red Quartz Tintcoat, and Carbon Black Metallic are replaced with Brownstone Metallic, Cayenne Red Tintcoat, and Ebony Twilight Metallic, respectively. Smokey Quartz Metallic was removed from the available color options and Hunter Metallic was added as a new paint color. For the 2021 GMC Sierra, the previously un-named "Sierra" trim becomes the "Pro".

Forward Collision Alert, Automatic Emergency Braking, and Front Pedestrian Braking options are now available on Silverado WT and Custom trim levels as part of the Safety Confidence Package. Crew Cab Standard Box Sierra 1500 models are now only available in four wheel-drive.

Due to the global microchip shortage, some 2021 Silverado and Sierra vehicles are built without options like Automatic Start-stop and heated and ventilated front seats, heated outboard rear seats, and heated steering wheel.

2022 changes 

The 2022 Chevy Silverado LTD and GMC Sierra Limited entered the model lineup as a stop-gap measure until production of the newly refreshed 2022 model begins. As such, the 2022 Silverado LTD and Sierra Limited have very few changes from the 2021 models.

Notable changes for the 2022 Limited models include the deletion of both the 4.3-liter LV3 EcoTec3 V6 and 5.3-liter L82 EcoTec3 V8 with active fuel management (AFM) gasoline engines, which have been discontinued, as well as the previous "6L80" six-speed automatic transmission, leaving only eight-speed and ten-speed units. The LT Trail Boss trim-level (Chevrolet) is now available with the 3.0-liter Duramax turbodiesel engine.

2022 refresh 
For the 2022 model year, the Chevrolet Silverado 1500 and GMC Sierra 1500 receives a mid-cycle refresh that includes the following new trim levels for the Chevrolet Silverado, called the ZR2, and for the GMC Sierra, called the AT4X and Denali Ultimate. The refresh also includes a new front-end design, as well as a revised interior. All trucks equipped with front bucket seats receive a new center console-mounted transmission shift lever (trucks equipped with a front bench seat retain the previous column-mounted gear selector lever). The 3.0-liter Duramax turbocharged diesel engine now has expanded availability on more trim levels.

The short  pickup box option has returned available for the Chevrolet Silverado 1500 and GMC Sierra 1500 Regular Cabs since last offered for the 2018 previous generation, which was previously only available in Mexico and the Middle East and is only available with the W/T and Pro trims of the Silverado and Sierra, respectively (these trims also remain the only trims available in the Regular Cab body style). Base Silverado 1500 WT and Sierra 1500 Pro Regular Cab models now receive standard power windows, door locks and push-button start, although keyless entry remains an extra-cost option. All models from the LT (Silverado) and SLE (Sierra) and above receive a newly standard 13.4-inch touchscreen infotainment system, which includes wireless Apple CarPlay and Android Auto smartphone integration and SiriusXM Satellite Radio with 360L (up-level models also receive connected GPS navigation), while base models retain the previously standard seven-inch touchscreen display. A new Silverado 1500 ZR2 model becomes the most off-road capable model in the lineup, while a new Sierra 1500 Denali Ultimate is now the top-tier trim of the lineup, which also receives a new premium Bose surround sound audio system with an amplifier, subwoofer, and genuine metal speaker grilles. Top-tier Silverado and Sierra models receive the General Motors Super Cruise semi-autonomous driving system, which allows for hands-free driving on most highways, and all models receive more standard safety equipment.

The new trim level introduced to this series as ZR2 (Chevrolet) which slots in between High Country (Chevrolet) and LTZ (Chevrolet). GMC models receive a similar, though more upscale, model known as AT4X.

The refreshed 2022 Chevrolet Silverado 1500 and GMC Sierra 1500 began shipping to dealerships in the Spring of 2022. Both brands will also sell the outgoing models of both trucks, named the Silverado 1500 LTD and Sierra 1500 Limited respectively, alongside the new models. Only 1500 (half-ton) models of both trucks have been refreshed for 2022, with a refresh of the heavy-duty (2500HD and 3500HD) trucks following in 2024.

Safety
The 2022 Silverado 1500 LTD Crew Cab was tested by the Insurance Institute for Highway Safety (IIHS):

Silverado EV

In April 2021, GM President Mark Reuss announced Chevrolet would be building an electric variant of the Chevrolet Silverado 1500 pickup truck at the Factory ZERO complex in Detroit. The vehicle will have a targeted range of 400 miles. The vehicle was unveiled in January 2022 at the 2022 Consumer Electronics Show (CES). The vehicle has been built from the ground up as a fully electric pickup by using a battery electric platform shared with the GMC Hummer EV, instead of using the existing Silverado platform. Production will start in the Factory ZERO assembly plant (formerly Detroit-Hamtramck Assembly) in the second quarter of 2023.

Medium duty version (4500HD, 5500HD, 6500HD and International CV) 
For 2019, General Motors released the medium-duty Silverado 4500/5500/6500HD, joining the Chevrolet LCF 3500/4500/5500 model line (derived from the Isuzu NPR).  The successor to the previous Chevrolet Kodiak and GMC TopKick, the medium-duty Silverado was developed in a joint venture with Navistar; the latter company assembles the vehicle lines at its Springfield, Ohio facility.   

In contrast to previous branding tradition, GM markets the medium-duty line exclusively as a Chevrolet with no GMC equivalent; along with a lack of divisional support for the segment, GM is seeking to rebrand the current GMC line as premium vehicles.  Navistar offers a rebranded version of the Silverado 4500-6500HD as the International CV, its smallest model line (replacing the International TerraStar).  With the exception of grilles and badging, both model lines are identical.  

In contrast to smaller Silverado pickup trucks, the 4500-6500HD is only offered as a chassis cab vehicle intended for the addition of rear bodywork (by second-party manufacturers).  Alongside the International CV, it is marketed in two-door or four-door cabs with rear-wheel or 4x4 drive.  Competing against the Ford F-450/F-550 Super Duty and Ram 4500-5500, the model line is a Class 4-6 truck.  Both Chevrolet and International vehicles are powered by a  variant of the Duramax 6.6L V8 diesel paired with an Allison 1000 or 2000 series automatic transmission.

At its launch, GM introduced the model line primarily through its dealer network that specialized in fleet and commercial truck sales, alongside an additional limited number of selected dealerships.

Military applications

LSSV
When production of the CUCV II ended in 2000, GM redesigned it to coincide with civilian truck offerings. The CUCV nomenclature was changed to Light Service Support Vehicle (LSSV) in 2001.  In 2005, LSSV production switched to AM General, a unit of MacAndrews and Forbes Holdings. The LSSV is a GM-built Chevrolet Silverado 1500, Chevrolet Silverado 2500 HD, Chevrolet Tahoe, or Chevrolet Suburban that is powered by a Duramax 6.6 liter turbo diesel engine. The various Silverados, Tahoes, and Suburbans that are used provide numerous platforms for different kinds of vehicles. As GM has redesigned its civilian trucks and SUVs from 2001–present, LSSVs have also been updated cosmetically.

The Militarization of standard GM trucks/SUVs to become LSSVs includes exterior changes such as CARC paint (Forest Green, Desert Sand, or 3-color Camouflage), blackout lights, military bumpers, a brush guard, a NATO slave receptacle/NATO trailer receptacle, a pintle hook and tow shackles. The electrical system is changed to the 24/12-volt military standard. The dashboard has additional controls and data plates. The truck also can be equipped with weapon supports in the cab, cargo tie down hooks, folding troop seats, pioneer tools, winches, and other military accessories.

The Enhanced Mobility Package (EMP) option adds enhanced suspension, 4-wheel anti-lock brakes, a locking differential, on/off-road beadlock tires, a tire pressure monitoring system and other upgrades. About 2,000 LSSV units were sold to U.S. and international military and law enforcement organizations.

Variants
Cargo/Troop Carrier Pickup (2-door, Extended Cab, or 4-door Silverado)
Cargo/Command Vehicle (4-door Tahoe)
Cargo/Trooprier/Command Vehicle/Ambulance (4-door Suburban)

ZH2

General Motors relaunched GM Defense division in 2018 offering the ZH2 Silverado, an advanced technology Chevrolet Silverado with a hydrogen powered fuel cell and a heavy-duty truck architecture modified for next generation military vehicle needs. There is also a ZH2 Chevrolet Colorado military version.

Awards

Chevrolet Silverado
 1999 - Motor Trend magazine's Truck of the Year
 2001 - Motor Trend magazine's Truck of the Year (Heavy Duty Model)
 2001 - Car and Driver magazine's Best Pickup Truck
 2002 - Car and Driver magazine's Best Pickup Truck
 2003 - Car and Driver magazine's Best Pickup Truck
 2005 - J.D. Power 2005 most dependable heavy-duty full-size pickup (2002 Silverado 2500HD)
 2007 - North American Truck of the Year
 2007 - Motor Trend magazine's Truck of the Year 
 2007 - ICOTY International Truck of the Year
 2007 - Truckin' magazine's Truck of the Year
 2011 - Motor Trend magazine's Truck of the Year (2011 Silverado HD)
 2015 - Most dependable heavy-duty full-size pickup by J.D. Power (2012 Silverado HD)
 2017 - Kelley Blue Book's KBB 5-YEAR COST TO OWN (FULL-SIZE PICKUP) (2017 Silverado 1500 Regular Cab)
 2017 - Kelley Blue Book's 2017 KBB BEST RESALE VALUE: FULL-SIZE PICKUP (2017 Silverado 1500)
 2018 - J.D. Power Most dependable full-size light-duty pickup (2015 Silverado 1500)
 2018 - Kelley Blue Book's KBB.COM BEST RESALE VALUE: FULL-SIZE PICKUP (2018 Silverado HD)
 2018 - NHTSA'S (National Highway and Traffic Safety Administration's) 5-Star Overall Vehicle Score
 2018 - Finalist for 2018 SEMA Truck of the Year.
 2018 - Motor Trend's Truck of the Year Finalist  (2019 model year)
 2018 - iSeeCars Top 10 Vehicles With the Lowest Depreciation (2013 Silverado 1500)
 2018 - North American Car, Utility and Truck of the Year finalist (including GMC Sierra) 
 2018 - PickupTrucks.com One-Ton Heavy-Duty Challenge (2018 Silverado 3500HD High Country Duramax)
 2018 - Ward's Best Engine Award (6.2-liter EcoTec3 V8)
 2020 - Cars.com Best Pickup Truck of 2020 (2020 Silverado HD)
 2021 - J.D. Power Best Resale Value Large Light Duty Pickup (2021 Chevrolet Silverado 1500)
 2021 - J.D. Power Best Resale Value Large Heavy Duty Pickup (2021 Chevrolet Silverado HD)
 2022 - J.D. Power Best Resale Value Large Heavy Duty Pickup (2022 Chevrolet Silverado HD)
 2023 - Four Wheeler 2023 Pickup Truck of the Year (2023 Chevrolet Silverado ZR2)

GMC Sierra
 2013 - J.D. Power Most dependable large pickup (2010 Sierra 2500HD)
 2014 -  Consumer Guide Best Buy Award (Sierra 1500)
 2014 - Ward's 10 Best Interiors (2014 Sierra 1500 Denali)
 2015 - Cars.com Ultimate One-Ton Challenge Winner (2015 Sierra 3500HD Dually Duramax Diesel)
 2015 - Most dependable full-size light-duty pickup by J.D. Power (2012 Sierra 1500)
 2018 - Pickuptrucks.com Best Half-Ton Truck (2019 GMC Sierra 1500 Crew Cab SLT)  
 2018 - VINCENTRIC BEST FLEET VALUE IN AMERICA 3/4-TON PICKUP (2018 GMC Sierra 2500HD Crew Cab 2WD)
 2018 - iSeeCars Top 10 Vehicles With the Lowest Depreciation (2013 GMC Sierra 1500)
 2019 - Canadian Truck King Challenge Winner (2019 Sierra 1500 Denali 6.2-liter)
 2020 - Ward's Best Engine Award (3.0-liter Inline-6 Duramax Diesel)
 2021 - Kelley Blue Book Best Resale Value By Category Full-Size Heavy Duty Pickup (GMC Sierra HD)
 2022 - Kelley Blue Book Best Resale Value Top-10 (2022 GMC Sierra)

Motorsport

Chevrolet is represented in the NASCAR Camping World Truck Series by the Silverado. As of the 2021 season, 15 full-time and part-time teams use the Silverado. Chevrolet has won the Truck Series Manufacturers Championship ten times since the series inception in 1995 and Chevrolet drivers have won the Drivers Championship a combined 12-times. The Silverado is also the title sponsor for the Chevrolet Silverado 250 Truck Series race at Canadian Tire Motorsport Park.

The truck also won the Primm 300 off-road race in 2004, 2005 and 2006.

World markets

As of 2015, the Chevrolet Silverado is sold in the United States, Canada, Mexico, Venezuela, Chile, and the Middle East (except Iran). As of 2022, the GMC Sierra is sold in the United States, Canada, Mexico, and the Middle East (except Israel and Iran). The GMC Sierra Denali was introduced to South Korea in 2022 with the launch of the GMC brand in the Korean market.

Chevrolet started selling the Silverado in Oceania in 2018 via Holden Special Vehicles (a former subsidiary of GM's now defunct Holden brand), and currently via GM Specialty Vehicles, though it retains the Chevrolet badge. The vehicles are sold in right-hand-drive versions for that region.

Sales

Special use Silverados and Sierras

See also
 List of pickup trucks
 List of Chevrolet pickup trucks
 Chevrolet Avalanche
 General Motors C/K trucks
 Chevrolet S-10/Chevrolet Colorado
 List of hybrid vehicles

References

External links

 
 GMC Sierra (twin vehicle)

Silverado
Navistar International trucks
2000s cars
2010s cars
2020s cars
All-wheel-drive vehicles
Flexible-fuel vehicles
Goods manufactured in Canada
Hybrid electric vehicles
Hybrid trucks
Military light utility vehicles
Military trucks
Motor vehicles manufactured in the United States
Pickup trucks
Rear-wheel-drive vehicles
Cars introduced in 1998
Quadrasteer
Class 3 trucks